Jon Francis Koncak (born May 17, 1963) is an American former professional basketball player. A 7'0" center from Southern Methodist University (SMU), Koncak was selected with the fifth pick in the 1985 NBA draft by the Atlanta Hawks. Koncak spent ten seasons with the Hawks (1985–1995), mainly in a reserve role, then concluded his career with the Orlando Magic. He retired in 1996 with career totals of 3,520 points and 3,856 rebounds.

Koncak received a six-year, $13 million contract from the Hawks in 1989 – an unprecedented total for a reserve. Since he was a restricted free agent at the time, the Atlanta Hawks matched this offer from the Detroit Pistons. As a result, he earned the derisive nickname "Jon Contract".

On February 23, 2008 SMU retired Koncak's jersey. Koncak is an Eagle Scout.

Koncak also won a gold medal at the 1984 Summer Olympics as a part of the United States men's basketball team.

References

External links

1963 births
Living people
All-American college men's basketball players
American men's basketball players
Atlanta Hawks draft picks
Atlanta Hawks players
Basketball players at the 1984 Summer Olympics
Basketball players from Iowa
Basketball players from Kansas City, Missouri
Centers (basketball)
Medalists at the 1984 Summer Olympics
Olympic gold medalists for the United States in basketball
Orlando Magic players
SMU Mustangs men's basketball players
Sportspeople from Cedar Rapids, Iowa
United States men's national basketball team players